Matthew Ridley may refer to:

Matthew Ridley (barrister), British Member of Parliament for Newcastle-upon-Tyne, 1747–1774
Sir Matthew White Ridley, 2nd Baronet (1745–1813)
Sir Matthew White Ridley, 3rd Baronet (1778–1836)
Sir Matthew White Ridley, 4th Baronet (1807–1877)
Matthew White Ridley, 1st Viscount Ridley (1842–1904)
Matthew White Ridley, 2nd Viscount Ridley (1874–1916)
Matthew White Ridley, 3rd Viscount Ridley (1902–1964)
Matthew White Ridley, 4th Viscount Ridley (1925–2012)
Matt Ridley (Matthew White Ridley, 5th Viscount Ridley, 1958–), British science writer